The metallic starling (Aplonis metallica), also known as the shining starling, is a bird in the starling family native to the Moluccas, New Guinea, Queensland and the Solomon Islands.

Description

The adult has brilliant red eyes, a long forked tail and green-glossed black plumage. Immatures are pale below with dark streaks.

Behaviour
They are very social and flocks of them build messy suspended globular nests in tall rain forest trees where they breed, possibly only during the wet season (north-west monsoon, October–March) (observed at Kokopo, East New Britain Province, 2016). They are not fearful of humans and their activity on the ground below, being well separated from them by altitude, but a loud noise will see them fly out in a tight formation, circle, then return to their nests. Their movement is very fast. During the early part of the 20th century, a flock (or flocks) were seen to migrate during August to Dunk Island in far north Queensland, where they mate, preparing messy globular nests for their young which hang from tall trees. There they remain until April, whereupon they make their return journey to New Guinea. They are also seen in other areas of Queensland including Kuranda in the Atherton Tablelands, and Mossman Gorge.

Gallery

References

External links
BirdLife Species Factsheet

metallic starling
metallic starling
Birds of the Maluku Islands
Birds of New Guinea
Birds of the Solomon Islands
Birds of Queensland
metallic starling